Christopher Paget Mayhew, Baron Mayhew (12 June 1915 – 7 January 1997) was a British politician who was a Labour Member of Parliament (MP) from 1945 to 1950 and from 1951 to 1974, when he left the Labour Party to join the Liberals. In 1981 Mayhew received a life peerage and was raised to the House of Lords as Baron Mayhew. He is most known for his central role in founding the Information Research Department (IRD), a secret wing of the UK Foreign Office dedicated to Cold War propaganda.

Early life
Christopher Paget Mayhew was the son of Sir Basil Mayhew of Felthorpe Hall, Norwich.

Mayhew attended Haileybury and Christ Church, Oxford, as an exhibitioner. In 1934 he holidayed in Moscow. While he was at Oxford, he became President of the Oxford Union. He was commissioned into the Intelligence Corps in 1940, rising to the rank of Major.

Political career
Mayhew was elected to Parliament for the constituency of South Norfolk in the general election of 1945.

In 1945, Mayhew became Under-Secretary of State at the Foreign Office, where he served under Ernest Bevin. Mayhew lost his seat in 1950, but soon returned to Parliament after the death of Bevin, when he won the by-election in 1951 for Bevin's seat of Woolwich East.

During Labour's 13 years in opposition, from 1951 to 1964, Mayhew presented the Labour Party on television, both as a commentator on the BBC and as a presenter on Party Political Broadcasts. He introduced the first Labour broadcast, in 1951, in which he talked with Sir Hartley Shawcross. Mayhew became known as one of the fiercest opponents of unilateral nuclear disarmament in the Labour Party. He also served as Shadow War Secretary from 1960 to 1961 and as a spokesman on foreign affairs from 1961 to 1964.

When Labour took office in 1964, Mayhew was appointed as Minister of Defence for the Royal Navy. However, in 1966, after the Wilson government decided to shift British airpower from carrier-based planes to land-based planes and cancel the CVA-01 aircraft carrier programme,  Mayhew resigned along with the First Sea Lord, Sir David Luce.

Mayhew was a consistent advocate of Palestinian rights. In 1971, with fellow MP Dennis Walters and publisher Claud Morris, he launched a bi-monthly journal, Middle East International (MEI). The journal was funded by a foundation set up in Geneva by former ambassador Harold Beeley calling itself the Aran Non-Arab Foundation  (ANAF). Beeley was to become vice-chairman of MEI. After a disagreement with Morris, Mathew took over as publisher and remained Chairman of MEI until his death in 1997. MEI continued to be published for a further eight years. Over its thirty-four years MEI had a number of retired British diplomats serving as directors, including James Craig and Anthony Nutting. It was described by The Jewish Chronicle as the “authoritative voice of the pro-Arab lobby”.

In 1973, Mayhew offered £5,000 to anyone who could produce evidence that Nasser had stated that he sought to "drive the Jews into the sea". Mayhew repeated the offer later in the House of Commons (Hansard, 18 October 1973) and broadened it to include any genocidal statement by any responsible Arab leader (The Guardian, 9 September 1974), while reserving for himself the right to be the arbiter of the authenticity of any purported statements as well as their meaning. Mayhew received several letters from claimants, each one producing one quotation or another from an Arab leader, all of which Mayhew deemed to be fabricated.

One claimant, Warren Bergson, took Mayhew to court. The case came before the High Court in February 1976. Bergson was unable to offer evidence of Nasser's alleged statement and acknowledged that, after thorough research, he had been unable to find any statement by a responsible Arab leader that could be described as genocidal. Bergson's lawyer admitted that the full version of one statement Bergson had relied on was not genocidal in intent. Bergson offered an apology to Mayhew.

Move to Liberal Party
Mayhew had been feeling increasingly uneasy with Labour policies under Harold Wilson and in 1974 he moved to the Liberals, being the first Member of Parliament to cross the floor to the Liberals in several decades. In the general election in October 1974, Mayhew contested Bath instead of Woolwich East in order not to split his former constituency party. He was defeated in Bath, which he also unsuccessfully contested in 1979.

On 6 July 1981 Mayhew became a life peer with the title Baron Mayhew, of Wimbledon in Greater London, and became the Liberals' spokesman on defence in the House of Lords.

Other activities
Mayhew was also active as an advocate for the mentally ill and served as Chairman of MIND (National Association for Mental Health) from 1992 to 1997.

He wrote several books, including Publish It Not: The Middle East Cover-Up (co-written with Michael Adams, 1975) and his autobiography, Time To Explain (1987).

Panorama experiment
In 1955 Mayhew took part in an experiment that was intended to form a Panorama special for BBC TV, but was never broadcast. Under the guidance of his friend Humphry Osmond, Mayhew ingested 400 mg of mescaline hydrochloride and allowed himself to be filmed for the duration of the trip. Samples of the audio were used in the psychedelic dance tracks "Mayhew Speaks Out" and "Christopher Mayhew Says" by the band the Shamen. Part of the footage was included in the BBC documentary LSD – The Beyond Within (1986).

Personal life
In 1949, he married Cicely Ludlam, whom he met when she was one of few women in the diplomatic service, and they had two sons and two daughters.

Publications
 Dear Viewer (1953)
 Man Seeking God (1955)
 Commercial Television - What is to be done? (1959)
 Coexistence plus. A positive approach to world peace (1962)
 Britain’s role tomorrow (1967)
 Publish it not. The Middle East cover up (1975)
 The Disillusioned Voter’s Guide to Electoral Reform (1976)
 Time to Explain: An Autobiography (1997)
 A War of Words: A Cold War Witness (1998)

References

External links
 
 Amazon entry for Publish It Not: The Middle East Cover Up
 

1915 births
1997 deaths
Alumni of Christ Church, Oxford
British Army personnel of World War II
Information Research Department
Intelligence Corps officers
Labour Party (UK) MPs for English constituencies
Liberal Democrats (UK) life peers
Liberal Party (UK) MPs for English constituencies
Liberal Party (UK) life peers
Members of the Fabian Society
Ministers in the Attlee governments, 1945–1951
Ministers in the Wilson governments, 1964–1970
People educated at Haileybury and Imperial Service College
Presidents of the Oxford Union
UK MPs 1945–1950
UK MPs 1950–1951
UK MPs 1951–1955
UK MPs 1955–1959
UK MPs 1959–1964
UK MPs 1964–1966
UK MPs 1966–1970
UK MPs 1970–1974
UK MPs 1974
Life peers created by Elizabeth II